2018 Elite 10 may refer to:

2018 Elite 10 (March)
2018 Elite 10 (September)